Jammi Darnell German (born July 4, 1974) is a former American football wide receiver of the National Football League.

College career
He played at the University of Miami.

Professional career

Atlanta Falcons
He was drafted in the 3rd round by the Atlanta Falcons of 1998 NFL Draft.

Cleveland Browns
He spent his final year with the Cleveland Browns.

References

1974 births
Living people
American football wide receivers
Miami Hurricanes football players
Players of American football from Florida
Sportspeople from Fort Myers, Florida
Atlanta Falcons players
Cleveland Browns players